Adiana Talakai (born 24 February 1999) is an Australian rugby union player. She plays at Hooker for the NSW Waratahs in the Super W competition.

Biography 
Talakai started on her international debut for Australia against Fiji on 6 May 2022 at the Suncorp Stadium in Brisbane. She came off the bench in her second test appearance against Japan at the Bond Sports Park in the Gold Coast on 10 May.

Talakai was named in the squad for the 2022 Pacific Four Series. She started against the Black Ferns in the opening match of the Pacific Four series on 6 June. She was named in the Wallaroos squad for a two-test series against the Black Ferns at the Laurie O'Reilly Cup.

Talakai made the Wallaroos side again for the delayed 2022 Rugby World Cup in New Zealand.

References

External links
Wallaroos Profile

1999 births
Living people
Australia women's international rugby union players
Australian female rugby union players
21st-century Australian women